U-17 Minsk Tournament is annual winter association football friendly competition for junior national under-17 teams that take place in Minsk, Belarus, since 2005. The traditional winter tournament are organize of the Association Belarusian Football Federation and the Minsk City Executive Committee.

The first tournament was held in February 2005 in Minsk, and the winner was the Serbia and Montenegro national under-17 teams.

The tournament participants was divided into two group of four invited under-17 national teams. The winners of group play in the final, the second place teams play match for the 3rd place, the third team in group play match for 5th place, the fourth team in the group play match for 7th place.

Champions

References

External links 
 U-17 Minsk Tournament at Rec.Sport.Soccer Statistics Foundation
 U-17 Minsk Tournament at Football Federation of Belarus

International association football competitions hosted by Belarus
Recurring sporting events established in 2005
2005 establishments in Belarus